Jenna Netherton (born Jenna J. Haggar on December 11, 1985) is an American politician and a Republican member of the South Dakota House of Representatives representing District 5 since January 11, 2013. Netherton served consecutively from January 11, 2011 until January 11, 2013 in the District 15 seat. She is the daughter of Don Haggar, another former District 10 representative.

Elections
2012 Redistricted to District 10, and with incumbent Republican Representative Gene Abdallah running to return to the South Dakota Senate and Roger Hunt term limited and leaving both District 10 seats open, Netherton ran alongside her father in the three-way June 5, 2012 Republican Primary, where she placed first with 623 votes (42.67%) and he placed second ahead of former state Senator Dave Munson; in the four-way November 6, 2012 General election, she took the first seat with 5,316 votes (31,50%) and her father took the second seat ahead of Democratic nominees Jo Hausman and Brian Parsons.
2010 Running as an Independent to challenge District 15 incumbent Democratic Representatives Patrick Kirschman and Martha Vanderlinde in the three-way November 2, 2010 General election, Netherton took the first seat with 2,264 votes (38.50%) and incumbent Representative Kirschman took the second seat ahead of incumbent Representative Vanderlinde.

References

External links
Official page at the South Dakota Legislature
Campaign site
 

Place of birth missing (living people)
Living people
Members of the South Dakota House of Representatives
Politicians from Sioux Falls, South Dakota
South Dakota Independents
South Dakota Republicans
Women state legislators in South Dakota
1986 births
21st-century American politicians
21st-century American women politicians